Phallic Rock is a precambrian granite rock formation in Carefree, Arizona, United States. The formation is caused by spheroidal weathering whereby the composition of the granite and its crystal structure facilitated the development of rounded corners and its unique phallic tubular shape. The formation is best viewed from the western side looking east. There is a dirt pull-off on the side of Stagecoach Pass Road with enough room for several vehicles.

References

Literature cited
 Esperança, S. and J. R. Holloway (1984) Lower crustal nodules from the Camp Creek latite, Carefree, Arizona. Kimberlites II: The mantle and cryst-mantle relationships. J. Kornprobst, Elsevier II: 219–227.

Rock formations of Arizona
Landforms of Maricopa County, Arizona